This is a summary of the 2011 KLPGA Tour.

Events in bold are majors.

LPGA Hana Bank Championship is co-sanctioned with LPGA Tour.

See also
2011 in golf

External links

LPGA of Korea Tour
LPGA of Korea Tour